Eeva Tikka (born 31 July 1939 in Ristiina) is a Finnish writer who wrote Hiljainen kesä, which received the 1980 Thanks for the Book Award.

References

1939 births
Finnish women writers
Living people
Writers from South Savo